This is a list of technopolis in Turkey. There are 45 technopolis in Turkey. 32 of them, shown as green in list, are currently in service. 13 of them, shown as red in list, are currently under construction.

History

Technology parks was revived by State Planning Organization in 1989.

References

I

Science parks in Turkey